Noah Matthew Galloway (born October 28, 1981) is a former United States Army soldier, motivational speaker, and extreme sports enthusiast. He was injured during the Iraq War, losing his left arm above the elbow and left leg above the knee. He was a contestant on Dancing with the Stars season 20, paired with Sharna Burgess. The pair finished in third place. He led his team to victory in the first season of the American Grit TV show on FOX. His book Living with No Excuses: The Remarkable Rebirth of an American Soldier was released in August 2016. Made an appearance on the Cross Over with Ted Davis, Dario Melendez and Armen Saryan on May 8, 2020. An Emmy award sports talk radio show based in Milwaukee, WI. Enjoys playing golf and throwing darts at his favorite brewery, Interstellar Ginger Beer & Exploration Co in Alabaster, AL.

Early life 
Galloway was born in Birmingham, Alabama, the son of Andy Galloway and Bebe Galloway. When Galloway was young, his father had an accident and lost his hand, but was able to work construction. Galloway said that his father was able to give him advice when he was injured, and understood his depression and mistakes. Galloway's family's background is Scottish. He has competed in sports events wearing a tartan kilt. Galloway said that his family has a history of serving in the military.

Career

Military 
Galloway joined the military in 2001 after 9/11. He was a Sergeant assigned to the 1st Battalion of the 502nd Infantry, 101st Airborne Division at Fort Campbell, Kentucky, during Operation Iraqi Freedom. On December 19, 2005, during his second deployment, he was severely injured in an IED attack in Yusafiah, Iraq. He lost his left arm above the elbow and his left leg above the knee; his right leg and jaw were badly injured, the latter having to be wired shut. He was unconscious for five days, and later was moved to Walter Reed Army Medical Center in Washington, D.C. for further treatment and rehabilitation.

Fitness competitions 
After leaving the Army, and going through an extended period of depression and addictions, first to pills, then to alcohol, with encouragement of his friend Eric Eisenberg who fits prosthetic devices at BioTech Limb & Brace, Galloway began focusing on fitness, reconnecting with his passion for sports that he had from his childhood and before his injury. Galloway eventually became a personal trainer. He participated in a variety of fitness competitions from regular 5K and 10K races to ones such as Tough Mudders, CrossFit competitions and Spartan events. Galloway was part of Operation Enduring Warrior, a non-profit organization that helps veterans via sports. Galloway was part of a team attempting to climb Carstensz Pyramid in Indonesia. Galloway said that social media helped him stay inspired to participate in the competitions and events.

Motivational speaker 
He is also a motivational speaker, addressing audiences of veterans, school children, and others with his message of "no excuses". Galloway appeared on the November 2014 cover of Men's Health magazine, the first reader to be selected for the magazine's cover, and was named the publication's "Ultimate Men's Health Guy". He has been a guest on The Ellen DeGeneres Show and The Today Show. In 2015, Galloway was featured on the cover of U.S. Veterans Magazine Summer issue.

Brand sponsorship 
In October 2014, Galloway became the spokesman and model for Kenneth Cole's new fragrance Mankind Ultimate. More recently, Galloway became a brand ambassador for Armitron Watches. Both he and Armitron champion the No Excuses Charitable Fund which empowers injured veterans through support of physical rehabilitative services.

Dancing with the Stars 
In 2015, Galloway was chosen as a contestant on Dancing with the Stars (season 20), and was paired with professional dancer and choreographer Sharna Burgess. While Galloway experimented with a prosthetic arm for his Argentine tango, he and Burgess decided not to use it, ultimately not using it in any of his dances. The producers told him before the competition began that he would not be assigned the jive or quickstep, since the quick, repetitive motions required for those dances would be too painful. On May 19, 2015, Galloway and Burgess finished the competition in third place losing to Riker Lynch and Rumer Willis who took second and first place, respectively.

Television appearances

Charity work
Galloway founded the No Excuses Charitable Fund. The fund, which assists organizations he feels are important, has aided Operation Enduring Warrior and also local programs including those for children at the YMCA of the town where he lives, Alabaster, Alabama.

In June 2016, Galloway accompanied high school students from Alabaster, Alabama's Thompson High School on a mission to Jutiapa, Honduras, to help provide computer labs as well as installing water chlorinators for fresh water.

Personal life 
After an eight-month courtship, Galloway married Amanda in June 2021. He is the father of four children. His oldest son, Colston, is from his first marriage. His son Jack and daughter Rian, are from his second marriage in 2007. That marriage also ended in divorce. His youngest, Matthew, was born on November 8, 2022.  

During the semi-finals of Dancing with the Stars, Galloway proposed to his girlfriend (later fiancée), Jamie Boyd, on air. On Monday, October 26, 2015, Galloway announced the end of the engagement.In late 2020, Noah began dating Amanda, whom he had met on a trip to New York City some years earlier. The relationship culminated in marriage in June 2021. The couple were wed in Calera, Alabama. On November 8, 2022, Noah and Amanda welcomed a son, Matthew Quin Galloway. 

In September 2015, as part of the Homes for Our Troops program and a Specially Adapted Housing Grant from the Veterans Administration, Galloway was given a mortgage-free home that is adaptable to wheelchairs, which he sometimes needs, as well as other features needed for amputees. The organization also provides veterans with financial planning assistance. Galloway had volunteered for the organization as a builder volunteer starting in 2010.

Works and publications

References

External links

 http://noahgalloway.com/NoahGalloway.com
 

1981 births
Living people
American amputees
American male triathletes
American motivational speakers
American strength and conditioning coaches
Track and field athletes with limb difference
Male models from Alabama
Participants in American reality television series
Philanthropists from Alabama
Track and field athletes from Birmingham, Alabama
United States Army personnel of the Iraq War
United States Army soldiers